Vaccinium elliottii (Elliott's blueberry) is a species of Vaccinium in the blueberry group (Vaccinium sect. Cyanococcus). It is native to the southeastern and south-central United States, from southeastern Virginia south to Florida, and west to Arkansas and Texas.

Growth
The flowers are pale pink, bell-shaped, 6–8 mm long, opening in the early spring before the new leaves appear.

The fruit is an edible berry 5–8 mm diameter. There are two variants one having tart shiny blue black berries and the other sweeter type having a whitish waxy bloom over the otherwise blue black berries; they ripen from late spring (in Florida) through summer (in Arkansas and Virginia).

Cultivation and uses
Vaccinium elliottii produces a particularly large yield of somewhat sour berries. It is popular for late-season fruit.

Gallery

See also
Vaccinium
Huckleberry

References

External links

United States Department of Agriculture Plants Profile: Vaccinium elliottii

elliotti
Blueberries
Flora of the Southeastern United States
Flora of the Appalachian Mountains
Plants described in 1860
Taxa named by Alvan Wentworth Chapman